USNS Cody (T-EPF-14) will be the fourteenth  and will be operated by the United States Navys Military Sealift Command. She will be the first ship in naval service named after Cody, Wyoming, and the first of the Flight II variant designed to have enhanced medical capabilities.

Cody is under construction in Mobile, Alabama by Austal USA.

References

Transports of the United States Navy
Ships built in Mobile, Alabama
Spearhead-class Joint High Speed Vessels